The Getaway World Tour was a concert tour by American rock band Red Hot Chili Peppers that was in support of their eleventh studio album, The Getaway which was released on June 17, 2016.  It marked the first time since June 2014 that the band has toured. The tour began with benefit shows and North American festival dates in February 2016 followed by a summer festival tour with dates in Europe, Asia and North America starting in May 2016 and ending in August 2016. The headlining tour to support the album began in Europe in September 2016 and lasted until the end of the year with the North American tour beginning in January 2017 and concluded in July 2017. Another European leg and dates in South America followed along with rescheduled shows and festival dates in North America in October 2017 to wrap up the tour. The band had festival dates in March 2018 for South America but they were not considered part of this tour. 
 It was also the band's last tour with their guitarist Josh Klinghoffer before his departure from the band in late December 2019, as their previous guitarist John Frusciante rejoined the group at that time.

The tour placed 32nd on Pollstar's year-end top 100 worldwide tours list for 2016, grossing a total of $46.2 million, and it finished as the 18th highest grossing worldwide tour in 2017 grossing $73.5 million.

Pre-tour benefit shows and North American festivals
Prior the summer festival dates in June 2016 and start of their headlining tour in September 2016, the band performed at a few benefit and North American festivals. On February 5, 2016, the band performed in Los Angeles at the FEEL THE BERN political fund-raiser in support of 2016 presidential candidate Bernie Sanders. "Nobody Weird Like Me" made its return to the set list for the first time since the 2006–07 Stadium Arcadium World Tour. The following night, they performed at a private, invitation-only Super Bowl 50 party in San Francisco called "DirecTV Super Saturday Night Co-Hosted by Mark Cuban's AXS TV" where they played "Aeroplane" for the first time since July 1997. The band also performed covers of "Cracked Actor" and "Starman" in tribute to their friend David Bowie, who died the previous month. On April 13, Flea played the national anthem before Kobe Bryant's final NBA game. That night, the Chili Peppers played four song set at an unannounced private show in Los Angeles in support of Sean Parker and The Parker Foundation Launch for The Parker Institute for Cancer Immunotherapy The band performed a sixteen-song set at the Jazz & Heritage Festival on April 24 where they were joined by The Meters for a jam. On April 29, 2016, Chad Smith and Will Ferrell will host the Red Hot Benefit Comedy + Music Show & Quinceanera. The benefit will featured a performance by the Chili Peppers along with comedy acts selected by Ferrell and Funny or Die. A portion of the proceeds will go to Ferrell's Cancer for College and Smith's Silverlake Conservatory of Music. It was announced in March 2016 that the band headline the 25th anniversary Lollapalooza festival in July. The band's May 14, 2016 performance at the KROQ Weenie Roast was suddenly cancelled prior to them going on stage due to Kiedis suffering stomach pains. The following show, an album preview show for The Getaway on May 17, 2016, was postponed until May 26, 2016. "Dark Necessities", the lead single from The Getaway, made its live debut on May 22, 2016. New songs "Go Robot" (the band was joined by Thundercat on bass), "Sick Love", "The Ticonderoga" all made their live debuts on May 26, 2016, at the album preview show for iHeartRadio which aired on DirectTV on June 17, 2016. "The Getaway", the title track to the new album, was released by the band on May 26, 2016, however unknown at the time to fans, the band had teased the song live during their performance of "Give It Away" at Super Bowl 50 party in San Francisco back in February. The song made its full live debut on May 29, 2016.

Anthony Kiedis health scare
On May 14, the band were forced to cancel their headlining slot at the annual KROQ Weenie Roast as Kiedis was rushed to the hospital prior to the band appearing on stage due to severe stomach pain. Flea alongside, Smith and Klinghoffer made an announcement on the stage as they were due to appear. It is unknown whether upcoming shows would be affected as a result Kiedis' mother Peggy posted the following morning on Facebook that "Anthony will be OK. No surgery is needed. I will keep you updated, I promise" It was confirmed that Kiedis was suffering from intestinal flu and was expected to make a full recovery soon however the band was forced to postpone their iHeartRadio album preview show on May 17, 2016, and has rescheduled it for May 26, 2016. The band returned to the stage on May 22, 2016, in Columbus, Ohio. According to Chad Smith, Kiedis had suffered from the stomach flu a few weeks earlier as well. In a May 20, 2016 interview with Entertainment Tonight Canada, his first since being released from the hospital, Kiedis said that his illness was brought on by an "inflammation in my guts" which he said was complicated by a recent stomach virus and existing scar tissue from previous hernia operations which required his stomach being pumped at the hospital due to his food not being able to properly digest. "That becomes an incredibly painful situation where you get a fever and pass out... Lo an behold, I'm on the mend" He went on to say "so it turned out to be a good thing, albeit painful and very sad to have to cancel a show. We don't really do that. I'd rather play deathly ill than not play at all, but in this particular instance, I was starting to go down, as in to the ground, so I got rushed to the hospital, got some help, and now I get to figure things out."

The Getaway world tour

Singer Anthony Kiedis in a May 5, 2016 interview discussed touring and said they were very excited to have a lot of new songs to play. Kiedis said "this being our second record with Josh, it feels a lot more fulfilling. And, it's always great to have a job as a musician. It's great to be in this band. We love seeing the world. But to have all these new songs at our disposal for live shows makes it feel like 'Let's go. Let's go. We have a mission now. You do this incredible thing in the studio and then you go practice and rehearse and make sure you can play this stuff live and then you go see the world. You know everywhere; from Asia to South America to Europe and Eastern Europe and hopefully the Middle East and Africa and you know, you give this music life to people far far away that it means something to and you have this communal experience together. And when you just can't take it for another day and you're beat and you're haggard and you're tired and you want to collapse and you come home and you gather some new life experience and start writing a little bit and Flea sits down at the piano and says, 'Hey, I have these chords. What do you think about these chords? And I say, hmmm, I hear melody in there and you start it all over again." Drummer Chad Smith said on May 17, 2016, that the band would be playing in Europe for pretty much the remainder of the year once the tour starts with the North American tour not happening until 2017.

All purchases of tickets through the band's website include a free download or physical copy of The Getaway. The production for the arena tour featured over 800 tube lights that stretched out across the audience. Throughout the show they would move up and down and change colour to create different patterns and effects.

Summer festivals

The Getaway World Tour got underway on June 4, 2016, with festival dates in Europe, Asia and North America which will last until August 2016.

A day after its release, "We Turn Red" made its live debut on June 10, 2016, at the Pinkpop festival while "Wet Sand" was performed for the first time in over two years. Flea, Anthony and Chad also teased George Clinton's "Bullet Proof", a song they haven't performed in 23 years. During the opening encore jam, Kiedis took over Flea's bass while Flea played keyboards and Klinghoffer played piano. The jam included a tease of The Beatles' "Hey Bulldog". After over three years not being performed, "Tell Me Baby" returned to the setlist on June 12, 2016, at Novarock. The rarely performed "She's Only 18" also made its return after a two-year absence. On June 13, 2016, in a pre-taped segment on The Late Late Show with James Corden, the band appeared in the show's popular Carpool Karaoke segment. During the filming of the segment, Kiedis saved the life of a baby. "a woman came out of her house, holding a child saying 'My baby, my baby, my baby can't breathe!' We all ran across the street, the woman thrust the baby into my arms, the baby was not breathing and I thought 'I’m gonna try and do a little baby CPR real quick, see if I can get some air in this kid.' Tried to open the mouth, [it was] like locked shut. So I started rubbing the belly, bubbles came out of the mouth, the eyes rolled back into place, the ambulance showed up and I handed the baby over, who was now breathing and fine, and we went back to Carpool Karaoke. The little baby looked at me the entire time until the ambulance came, little baby Nina." Kiedis said On June 14, 2016, the band performed eight songs at Studios SFP in France. "Dark Necessities" and "Give it Away" appeared on the television show Le Grand Journal while the remaining six songs, which included the live debut of "The Longest Wave", were recorded for radio station RTL2's "Très Très Privé" concert series. The Live in Paris EP was released on July 1, 2016, and features five songs from the Canal+ performance in Paris. The EP was released exclusively through the music streaming website Deezer. "Detroit" made its live debut on June 29, 2016, at the Roskilde Festival while "Goodbye Angels" made its live debut on July 10, 2016. "Dreams of a Samurai" made its live debut on July 24, 2016, at the Fuji Rock Festival in Japan.

In an August 2016 interview, Flea discussed touring and playing the same songs saying "Has there ever been a night where I've been like 'If I play fucking 'Give It Away' again my cock's gonna fall off'? Yes. There are moments of having a hard time finding the essence and spirit of a song, but in general it's all about the people in the end. It's all about connecting with the people.I try to keep myself in a place of being completely selfless about it and doing my best to use every song, whether it's one I've heard a million times or a new one, as a vehicle for connecting with people and making them feel less alone in the world."

European leg I
The band's European headlining tour began on September 1, 2016, and lasted until mid-December 2016. Deap Vally and Babymetal served as the opening acts. "Feasting on the Flowers" made its live debut on September 8, 2016, in Oslo, followed by "The Longest Wave" second time ever played on September 14 in Helsinki. "Search and Destroy" was performed for the first time since 2003 on September 10, 2016, in Sweden and for the first time with Klinghoffer. At the band's show of October 10, 2016 in Italy, Anthony's 9-year-old son Everly Bear joined his father in singing "Dreams of a Samurai". "Don't Forget Me" was briefly teased in tribute to a fan from Peru who died the previous year. The band's show of October 13, 2016 in Montpellier was cancelled due to weather conditions. The band is trying to reschedule the show. "The Zephyr Song" (which was in the band's setlist on November 1, 2016, but dropped in favor of "Soul to Squeeze") was performed for the first time since 2004 and first time with Josh on November 3, 2016. At the band's show of November 9, 2016 in Amsterdam they performed "Mommy Where's Daddy?". This was only the third time since 1999 the song has been performed. They had previously performed the song acoustically in September 2016 and once in September 2015. "Emit Remmus" was performed for the first time since 2012 while "Catholic School Girls Rule" and "Freaky Styley" were for teased at during the band's show of November 16, 2016 in Denmark. On November 17, 2016, in Germany the band performed "Yertle the Turtle" for the first time since 2001. The song was dedicated to one of the band's longtime fans who had been following them on the tour. Due to Kiedis suffering from flu like symptoms, the band was forced to postpone their December 20 and 21 shows in Ireland until September 20 and 21, 2017.

Los Angeles Rams opener and Silverlake performances
The band performed two songs before the opening home game of the Los Angeles Rams at the Los Angeles Memorial Coliseum on September 18, 2016. The Rams made their return to Los Angeles after 22 years in St. Louis. "Since I was a little boy, I've taken joy in the beauty of the Rams. When I moved to Los Angeles in 1972, I was getting uprooted from my home and I thought, 'Well, where I'm going they've got the Rams. It's going to be all right'" Flea said. On September 23, 2016, the band performed a short acoustic set at a benefit for the Silverlake Conservatory of Music. "Mommy, Where's Daddy?" from the band's debut album was performed for only the second time in the past 17 years (it was last performed in late 2015) and for the first time ever acoustically.

North American leg I
The band's 51 date North American leg began on January 5, 2017, and concluded on July 1, 2017. Due to overwhelming demand for tickets after selling out quickly and in response to scalpers, second shows in Boston and Philadelphia were added while second and third shows in New York City and Los Angeles were also added. Jack Irons, the band's original drummer and founding member of the band, will serve as opening act on all North American dates while Trombone Shorty and Orleans Avenue, Babymetal, IRONTOM and Deerhoof will serve as opening acts at various dates on the leg. At the opening show on the North American leg in San Antonio on January 5, 2017, the band performed "Breaking the Girl" for the first time since October 2012. "The Zephyr Song" was performed for the first time in the United States since July 2004 during the band's show of January 8, 2017 in Dallas, Texas. At that same show, Josh teased a cover of David Bowie's "The Bewlay Brothers" as a tribute to Bowie who died a year earlier on January 9, 2016. Members of The Meters, The Rebirth Brass Band and Trombone Shorty joined the band on "Give it Away" during their show of January 10, 2017 in New Orleans. The band was forced to postpone their Wichita show on January 15, 2017, to the following night due to inclement weather. On February 13, at their Philadelphia gig band teased 50 seconds version of "Out in L.A", in honor of their 34th anniversary. It was first time that song was performed since 1992 (according to some sources 2004) and first time with Josh. On March 2, 2017, the band announced that they were going to postpone their March 2, 4, 5 shows in Glendale, Denver and San Diego due to Anthony suffering from bronchitis. The San Diego date was rescheduled for later in the month while the other two dates were pushed back to October 2017. On March 17, 2017, at their show in Seattle, the band performed "Charlie" for the first time since 2012. On April 24, 2017, at their show in Jacksonville, "Encore" made its live debut, after some teases throughout the previous tours. At the band's show in Pittsburgh on May 11, 2017, they performed a cover of the Looking Glass song "Brandy (You're a Fine Girl)". The song was last performed in 2005 and played at most shows during their Roll on the Red tour. It also appeared on their Red Hot Chili Peppers Live in Hyde Park album. Following the band's performance of May 14, 2017 in Columbus, Ohio, Chad Smith sang the University of Michigan fight song "The Victors". Smith's singing of the fight song made national news as the University of Michigan and Ohio State University are longtime sports rivals and Smith was born in Detroit. Smith's drumset also like at past shows in Ohio featured the Michigan Wolverines logo. At the band's show of May 16, 2017 in Louisville, Kentucky, "Mommy, Where's Daddy?" was performed. The song, which is very rarely played, was last performed in November 2016 has been performed just four times since 1992 and only three times in the United States since then. "This Ticonderoga" was also performed for just the third time and first time since September 2016. At the band's show of May 18, 2017 in Indianapolis, Josh performed a cover of "Seasons" by Chris Cornell. Cornell, the front man for Soundgarden and Audioslave, was found dead earlier that day. At the band's show on May 28, 2017, in Edmonton they performed "Dosed" for the first time ever. It was teased in the past but the song had never been performed in its entirety since it was released in 2002. Zach Irons, son of founding Chili Peppers member Jack Irons and guitarist for opening act IRONTOM, provided a second guitar on the song. At this same show, Flea also briefly teased "Deep Kick", a song that hasn't been performed since 1996. On June 20, at the band's gig in Montreal, band's cover of Jimi Hendrix's song, a rarely performed "Fire" was played for the first time since November 2016 and for the second time in United States since By the Way Tour in 2003 (first time in September 2015, not counting Silverlake charity event in following month where it was performed acoustically). During the band's show on June 25, 2017, in Grand Rapids, Anthony Kiedis dedicated "Soul to Squeeze" to his father, Blackie Dammett, who was the long time manager of the band's fanclub and ran their website. Kiedis said "If you could be so kind. My father is fixin' to die and that's OK. He's had a wild, great journey and a helluva colourful badass life but he's sick and he's gonna to die now.. He's pretty lost; he's just a spirit but I would like for everyone just to take ten seconds to send him some love, to send his spirit some love because pretty soon he will be sailing on and I would appreciate it if his home town could send him love for a whole ten seconds of love. Let's give it up. Ten! Thank you. Let's do this tune. Appreciate it." Flea also during the show asked for a moment of silence for Hillel Slovak, the band's founding guitarist who died 29 years earlier. Following the moment of silence, Jack Irons joined his former band on stage to perform Jimi Hendrix's "Fire" as a tribute to Slovak.

Dave Rat, who has been with the band since February 1991 as the band's sound engineer, announced on January 12, 2017, that he would no longer be working with the band following their show of January 22, 2017 in Minnesota.

At the band's show in Atlanta on April 14, 2017, they shot the music video for their song "Goodbye Angels". Chad Smith told the fans on Twitter to "wear something colorful." The video was released on May 9, 2017.

European leg II
The band returned to Europe for a second leg starting on July 13, 2017. The leg will consist of mostly festivals along with some headlining dates with the leg expected to conclude on July 31, 2017. The second date on the leg saw the band perform for the first time ever in Benicàssim. The show featured a rare performance of "Fire" which was performed for only the fifth time on this tour. Mauro Refosco, who was a touring member of the band for their previous tour and also a studio musician on their two most recent albums, joined the band on percussion for "The Adventures of Rain Dance Maggie" at their July 20, 2017 show in Rome. Kiedis' young son Everly Bear also joined the band onstage to provide some vocals for "Goodbye Angels" which he also would do at the band's very first show in Latvia seven days later.

Dublin rescheduled shows
Due to Anthony Kiedis suffering from the flu, the band's shows on December 20 and 21, 2016 in Dublin at 3Arena were forced to be postponed and were rescheduled for September 20 and 21, 2017 at the same venue. During the band's show on September 21 in Dublin they performed "Get on Top" for the first time with Josh and for the first time since August 2007.

Latin American leg
On September 24, 2016, the first date of the leg was confirmed for September 24, 2017 at Rock in Rio. On February 20, 2017, it was announced that the band will perform in Mexico City on October 10, 2017.

North America rescheduled dates
Due to Anthony Kiedis suffering from bronchitis, the band was forced to postpone three shows in March 2017 with two of the shows in Denver and Glendale being rescheduled for October 16 and 18, 2017.  The band performed at the Austin City Limits Music Festival that on October 7 and 14, 2017 where Josh Klinghoffer performed "A Face in the Crowd" as a tribute to Tom Petty, who had recently died. Their performance of "What is Soul?" on October 7, 2017, was also dedicated to Petty. The tour officially ended on October 18, 2017, in Arizona.

Critical reception
The band's concert in Toronto received criticism from Canadian radio broadcaster Alan Cross. In his review of the concert, titled "An Exceptionally Honest Review of the Red Hot Chili Peppers in Toronto", Cross wrote that the concert "lacked Red Hotness". He stated that the band was "tardy" in getting to the stage and said that the band telling the audience "how long they had been coming to Toronto and how special we were to them", was something they “must say to all the girls…I mean cities.” Cross wrote that he expected more interaction with the audience and thought that the performance "felt a little cold". Cross further wrote, "I thought we had something special, as most virgins do, but sadly we were just another notch on a tour belt. Where was our love? The love that was going to help justify paying over a hundred bucks to sit in the middle of nowhere? The love that would probably get us to pay it again and again?" Cross claimed that the band gave a “K thanks bye” exit off the stage and wrote on the reaction of fellow concert attendees. "Shocked. Stunned. Pissed. We began making our way to the exits. “What the hell was THAT!?” was the general consensus as we all poured out of the stadium. My eyes continuously locked with other concert-goers, who were also wearing the disappointment on their face." Cross criticized the band for not playing longer than an hour and a half, stating, "Why can’t you be more like your younger brother Dave Grohl? Who can tear the roof off the Molson Amphitheater for three plus hours, pay the fine for going over his set time, all whilst sitting in a chair with a broken leg."

Tour dates

Cancelled/postponed shows

Notes

Songs performed

Originals

Cover teases (sung/performed by Josh solo unless otherwise noted)

 A recording of Eric Dolphy's version of "God Bless the Child" is played prior to the band taking the stage at every show

 The tour also included animated psychedelia visuals by featured animators of Adult Swim's Off the Air because Flea contacted its creator, Dave Hughes to produce such visuals having seen its special "Dan Deacon: When I Was Done Dying" music video. The animators behind the visuals are: Adam Fuchs (Around the World, Give It Away, Otherside), Kokofreakbean (By the Way), Anthony Francisco Schepperd (Give It Away), Hideki Inaba (Dark Necessities, The Getaway), Masanobu Hiraoka (Californication), Emanuele Kabu (Dani California) and Andrew Benson (Nobody Weird Like Me).

Personnel
Flea – bass, backing vocals, keyboards (during jam on 6/10/16)
Anthony Kiedis – lead vocals, bass (during jam on 6/10/16)
Josh Klinghoffer – guitar, backing vocals, piano (during jam on 6/10/16)
Chad Smith – drums, percussion

 Additional musicians
Chris Warren – keyboards, drum synthesizer, percussion
Nate Walcott – piano, keyboards, trumpet
Samuel Bañuelos III – second bass (on "Go Robot" and "Encore")

 Guest musicians

Opening acts
 Deap Vally (September 1–10, 2016)
 La Femme (October 2016)
 Babymetal (December 5–15, 2016, April 12–29, 2017)
 Trombone Shorty and Orleans Avenue (January 5 – March 18, 2017, October 16, 18, 2017)
 Jack Irons (January 5 – June 30, 2017, July 1, 2017, October 16, 18, 2017)
 IRONTOM (May 11–29, 2017)
 Deerhoof (June 18–25, 2017, June 30 – July 1, 2017)
 KNOWER  (July 20–21, 25–27, 2017)
 Lady Leshurr (September 20–21, 2017)
 Louis Cole (October 10–11, 2017)

External links
Red Hot Chili Peppers live recordings
RHCP Live Archive

References

2016 concert tours
2017 concert tours
Red Hot Chili Peppers concert tours
Concert tours of Europe